The 2017–18 Crown Prince Cup was the 43rd and final unfinished season of the Saudi premier knockout tournament for football teams of the Saudi Professional League. It began on 7 September 2017 and would have been concluded with the final in March 2018. However, it was abolished early during the first stage. 

Al-Ittihad are the defending champions after a 1–0 win over Al-Nassr in the final.

On 19 September 2017, the General Sports Authority decided to cancel and abolish the tournament and start the new edition next season

Changes and Format
For the first time, the Crown Prince Cup tournament will be contested by the 14 teams of the Pro League, having been decreased from the 30-team format that had been used since the 2013–14 season. Under this new format, the finalists from the previous season will receive a bye to the knockout stage while the remaining 12 enter at the preliminary round. The Crown Prince Cup is played as a knockout cup competition with each tie being played as a single match with the winner advancing to the next round.

On 16 June 2017 it was announced by the SAFF that VAR would be implemented in the tournament.

Participating teams 
Pro League (14 Teams)

First stage

Round of 16
The Round of 16 matches are to be played from 7 September to 30 October 2017. All times are local, AST (UTC+3).

Top goalscorers
As of 9 September 2017

Note: Players and teams marked in bold are still active in the competition.

References

Saudi Crown Prince Cup seasons
2017–18 domestic association football cups
Crown Prince Cup